The Public Interest Technology University Network (PIT-UN) is a consortium of universities and foundations that collaborate to develop the field of public interest technology. It was formed in March 2019.

The group currently has 54 member universities from across the U.S. and four international institutions.:

PIT-UN seeks to address challenges between industry and society. Member institutions are committed to bringing together students and educators from multiple disciplines together to solve the toughest challenges the U.S. and the world face, by building the nascent field of public interest technology and growing a new generation of civic-minded technologists. Through the development of curricula, research agendas, and experiential learning programs in the public interest technology space, the member institutions are using innovative tactics with the aim to develop graduates with multiple fluencies at the intersection of technology and policy.

In October 2019 the organization awarded US$3 million in grants to 27 institutions. The organization has since awarded two more rounds of funding through the PIT University Network Challenge. In 2020 28 institutions were awarded grants totaling $4.4 million, and in November 2021 $3.61 million was awarded to 24 institutions. Grants are exclusively available via application to members of PIT-UN.

Members 
The full list of current PIT-UN members as of December 2022 is:

 Arizona State University
 Boston University 
 Cal Poly State University
 Carnegie Mellon University
 Case Western Reserve University
 Center for Education and Research on Innovation (CEPI FGV São Paulo Law School), Brazil
 Cleveland State University-Ohio
 Columbia University
 Cornell University
 Florida International University
 Fordham University
 Georgetown University
 Georgia Institute of Technology
 Georgia State University
 Harvard University
 Howard University
 Illinois Institute of Technology
 Indiana University
 Lane College
 LeMoyne-Owen College
 Massachusetts Institute of Technology
 Meharry Medical College
 Miami Dade College
 Nazareth College
 New York University
 Northeastern University
 Olin College of Engineering
 Pardee RAND Graduate School
 Pennsylvania State University
 Pepperdine University
 Princeton University
 Prairie View A & M University
 Rochester Institute of Technology
 San Jose State University
 Stanford University
 Stillman College
 Temple University
 The City University of New York
 The George Washington University
 The Ohio State University
 The University of Texas, Austin
 The University of the South (Sewanee)
 University of Arizona
 University of California, Berkeley
 University of California, Santa Cruz
 University of Chicago
 University of Edinburgh, Scotland
 University of Illinois, Chicago
 University of Massachusetts, Amherst
 University of Michigan
 University of Pennsylvania
 University of Rijeka, Croatia
 University of Szeged, Hungary
 University of Virginia
 University of Washington
 Virginia Tech
 William & Mary
 Worcester Polytechnic Institute

Educational institutions interested in joining PIT UN can review the process on Pitcases

References

External links

University organizations
2019 establishments in the United States